Sambad is an Indian newspaper of Odia language which is published daily from Bhubaneswar, Odisha. It is the largest circulated Odia daily newspaper in Odisha. It is published from the capital city of Bhubaneswar, as well as from Cuttack, Berhampur, Rourkela, Sambalpur, Balasore, Jajpur, Jeypore, and  Angul
The first edition of this newspaper was published on October 4, 1984 in Bhubaneswar. Editor since the foundation is Soumya Ranjan Patnaik, a businessman-politician.

Sambad also has the largest readership in the state of Odisha.

See also
List of Odia-language television channels

References

Leading vernacular daily ‘Sambad’ secured top rank in Indian Readership Survey (IRS)-2017 retaining its position as the largest circulated daily newspaper in Odisha.

External links
sambad.in
sambadenglish.com

Odia-language newspapers
Daily newspapers published in India
Publications established in 1984
1984 establishments in Orissa
Mass media in Bhubaneswar